Shen Haixiong (born April 4, 1967) is a Chinese journalist and propaganda official, serving since July 2015 as the propaganda chief of Guangdong Province.  He is the current deputy minister of the Publicity Department of the Chinese Communist Party and head of the China Media Group, the umbrella state media organization. Shen was born in Wuxing, Huzhou, Zhejiang. He earned a bachelor's degree in Chinese at Hangzhou University, then an executive MBA from Shanghai Jiaotong University. He spent much of his career as a reporter and news editor, starting at the Zhejiang provincial division of Xinhua News Agency, then the editor-in-chief of the Shanghai branch of Xinhua, specializing in finance. He was selected for the "ten best Xinhua journalists" award in its inaugural year. In addition, he has worked in Korean Broadcasting System and Asahi Shimbun for more than five years. During much of this time he worked under Xi Jinping, who was Community Party secretary in Zhejiang then Shanghai. In 2010, while serving in Shanghai, he was named "outstanding and progressive individual" by the Chinese government for his work at Expo 2010 in Shanghai. In August 2012 he was elevated to deputy editor-in-chief of Xinhua, then in July 2014 the deputy director of the agency (vice-minister level). 

In July 2015, Shen was transferred to become a member of the provincial Party Standing Committee of Guangdong and provincial propaganda chief. On 21 March 2018, Shen was appointed as the head of China Central Television (CCTV). At the time, he was appointed as the President of China Media Group, which is the combination of China Central Television, China National Radio and China Radio International.

References

1967 births
Writers from Huzhou
People's Republic of China journalists
People's Republic of China politicians from Zhejiang
Living people
Politicians from Huzhou
Hangzhou University alumni
Chinese Communist Party politicians from Zhejiang
China Media Group
Xinhua News Agency people